Teushentherium is an extinct genus of notohippid notoungulate from the Oligocene of Argentina. Fossils have been found in the Sarmiento Formation of Argentina.

Etymology 
The genus name, Teushentherium, is derived from Teushen, one of the Chonan languages of the Tehuelche, and therion, which is greek for "beast". The specific name refers to Camarones, a typical coastal town of Chubut Province near the Barrancas Blancas locality.

Description
This animal, only known from fragmentary remains, was approximately the size of a goat. Its skull was rather massive and had a short muzzle. The dentition was complete and continuous (without diastema), and the premolars and molars were high-crowned (hypsodont), like in its relative Rhynchippus. The premolars had a well developed cingulum, while the molars were elongated. The shape of the premolars and molars was reminiscent to those of equids. Teushentherium, like its relatives, may have had a robust body with slender limbs.

Taxonomy 
Teushentherium was first described in 2021, based on fossilized remains found in the Sarmiento Formation in Argentina, in deposits dating to the Middle to Late Oligocene. Teushentherium was placed within the family Notohippidae, a family of toxodont notoungulates with horse-like teeth, with very high-crowned molars. More recent research, however, suggests that this group is paraphyletic, containing increasingly derived forms, some of them close to the ancestors of "true" Toxodontidae. In 2021, it was found to be the sister taxon to Mendozahippus.

The following position of the Toxodontia is based on Martínez et al. 2021, showing the position of Teushentherium.

References 

Toxodonts
Prehistoric placental genera
Oligocene mammals of South America
Paleogene Argentina
Fossils of Argentina
Tinguirirican
Deseadan
Fossil taxa described in 2021
Golfo San Jorge Basin
Sarmiento Formation